This is a list of Canadian television related events from 1981.

Events

Debuts

Ending this year

Television shows

1950s
Country Canada (1954–2007)
The Friendly Giant (1958–1985)
Hockey Night in Canada (1952–present)
The National (1954–present)
Front Page Challenge (1957–1995)
Wayne and Shuster Show (1958–1989)

1960s
CTV National News (1961–present)
Land and Sea (1964–present)
Man Alive (1967–2000)
Mr. Dressup (1967–1996)
The Nature of Things (1960–present, scientific documentary series)
Question Period (1967–present, news program)
Reach for the Top (1961–1985)
Take 30 (1962–1983)
The Tommy Hunter Show (1965–1992)
University of the Air (1966–1983)
W-FIVE (1966–present, newsmagazine program)

1970s
The Beachcombers (1972–1990)
Canada AM (1972–present, news program)
Celebrity Cooks (1975–1984)
City Lights (1973–1989)
Definition (1974–1989)
the fifth estate (1975–present, newsmagazine program)
The Great Detective (1979–1982)
Headline Hunters (1972–1983)
Let's Go (1976–1984)
The Littlest Hobo (1979–1985)Live It Up! (1978–1990)The Mad Dash (1978–1985)Marketplace (1972–present, newsmagazine program)Read All About It! (1979–1983)Second City Television (1976–1984)Smith & Smith (1979–1985)This Land (1970–1982)You Can't Do That on Television (1979–1990)V.I.P. (1973–1983)100 Huntley Street (1977–present, religious program)

1980sThe Alan Thicke Show (1980–1983)Bizarre (1980–1985)Home Fires (1980–1983)

TV moviesA Far Cry from HomeCopFinal EditionThe Olden Days CoatThe Plouffe Family (Les Plouffe)The Running ManSnowbirdYou've Come a Long Way, Katie''

Television stations

Debuts

See also
 1981 in Canada
 List of Canadian films of 1981

References